Tetta is a masculine Japanese given name.

Possible writings
Tetta can be written using different combinations of kanji characters. Some examples:

鉄太, "iron, thick"
鉄多, "iron, many"
鉄汰, "iron, excessive"
哲太, "philosophy, thick"
哲多, "philosophy, many"
哲汰, "philosophy, excessive"
徹太, "penetrate, thick"

The name can also be written in hiragana てった or katakana テッタ.

Notable people with the name
, Japanese footballer
, Japanese actor

Japanese masculine given names